The 2008 CONCACAF Women's Olympic Qualifying Tournament was an international football tournament that was held in Mexico from 2 to 12 April 2008. The six national teams involved in the tournament were required to register a squad of 20 players – of which two had to be goalkeepers – by 31 March 2008, two days prior to the opening match of the tournament. Only players in these squads were eligible to take part in the tournament.

The age listed for each player is on 2 April 2008, the first day of the tournament. The numbers of caps and goals listed for each player do not include any matches played after the start of the tournament. The club listed is the club for which the player last played a competitive match prior to the tournament. A flag is included for coaches who are of a different nationality to their team.

Group A

Jamaica
Manager:  René Simões

Mexico
Manager: Leonardo Cuéllar

Mexico named their final squad on 29 March 2008.

United States
Manager:  Pia Sundhage

The United States named their squad on 31 March 2008.

Group B

Canada
Manager:  Even Pellerud

Canada announced their squad on 30 March 2008.

Costa Rica
Manager: Juan Diego Quesada

Trinidad and Tobago
Manager: Jamaal Shabazz

References

Squads